James Albert Creighton (November 18, 1905 – May 29, 1990) was an ice hockey player and politician from Brandon, Manitoba.

Creighton played eleven games in the National Hockey League with the Detroit Falcons in 1931, scoring one goal and receiving one minor penalty. He was traded to the New York Americans in December 1931, but never played for the team. He later worked in the IHL and the Can-Am Leagues. Creighton became a professional hockey referee after retiring as a player, and later worked as a general insurance salesman.

He served as an alderman in Brandon in 1946, 1948 and 1949, and was mayor of the city from 1952 to 1955 and from 1958 to 1961.

Creighton won the Liberal-Progressive nomination for Brandon City in the 1953 provincial election, defeating W.A. Wood and J.C. MacDonald at a contested meeting. He lost to Progressive Conservative candidate Reginald Lissaman in the general election, receiving 3,063 votes (40.13%) on the first count and losing on the second. Provincial elections in Manitoba were conducted by the single transferable ballot in this period.

Later in the same year, Creighton ran for the House of Commons of Canada in the 1953 federal election as a Liberal candidate in Brandon—Souris. He received 8,456 votes, and finished second to Progressive Conservative Walter Dinsdale. He ran for the Manitoba legislature a second time in the 1962, and lost to Lissaman again.

He suffered from Parkinson's disease in his later years, and was eventually confined to a nursing home prior to his death in 1990.

Career statistics

Regular season and playoffs

External links

LostHockey.com obituaries

1905 births
1990 deaths
Boston Cubs players
Deaths from Parkinson's disease
Detroit Falcons players
Detroit Olympics (IHL) players
Ice hockey people from Manitoba
Kansas City Pla-Mors players
Manitoba Bisons ice hockey players
Mayors of Brandon, Manitoba
Philadelphia Arrows players
Sportspeople from Brandon, Manitoba
Neurological disease deaths in Canada
Canadian expatriate ice hockey players in the United States